Ti i ja is a studio album by Zdravko Čolić released in 1975.

Track listing

External links

1975 debut albums
Serbian-language albums
Zdravko Čolić albums